Shaun Paul Cassidy (born September 27, 1958) is an American singer, actor, writer, and producer. He has created and/or produced a number of television series including American Gothic, Roar and Invasion. Cassidy currently serves as executive producer and writer for NBC's medical drama New Amsterdam.

While in high school, Cassidy signed a contract with Warner Bros. Records, leading to his albums Shaun Cassidy, Born Late, Under Wraps, Room Service, and Wasp. Almost concurrently, Cassidy starred in the ABC television series The Hardy Boys Mysteries, as well as Breaking Away and had a stint on the daytime soap General Hospital.

While appearing on Broadway in the hit musical drama Blood Brothers, he wrote his first television pilot, American Gothic. In 2020, Cassidy returned to the stage with his one-man show The Magic of a Midnight Sky. Cassidy is the eldest son of Academy Award–winning actress Shirley Jones and Tony Award-winning actor Jack Cassidy. He is the younger half-brother of David Cassidy.

Career

Singer and recording artist 

While still in high school, Cassidy signed a contract with Mike Curb's division of Warner Bros. Records and began recording music. He scored a couple of hit singles in several countries, leading to an American release of his first solo album, Shaun Cassidy, in 1977. The multi-platinum album netted him a number-one U.S. single with "Da Doo Ron Ron" and a nomination for the Grammy Award for Best New Artist. The Eric Carmen–penned "That's Rock 'n' Roll" (which had already been a hit in Australia and Europe) was the follow-up single and peaked at No. 3. His popularity continued with the concurrent arrival of his television series, The Hardy Boys Mysteries (1977–1979), which also starred Parker Stevenson.

Cassidy's next album Born Late netted the hit "Hey Deanie" (#7), also written by Carmen, and a remake of The Lovin' Spoonful's "Do You Believe in Magic?" became a moderate hit for Cassidy, peaking at No. 31.

Cassidy had released two successful albums, but by the release of his third album, 1978's million-seller Under Wraps, AM radio was in decline and his teen-star appeal had begun to fade. His next album, Room Service, failed to chart on the US Billboard 200. Cassidy tried a different musical approach for his final release, 1980's Wasp. This album was more rock/pop-oriented and produced by Todd Rundgren with the group Utopia as the backing band. It featured songs written by Rundgren, Cassidy, and cover versions of songs including David Bowie's "Rebel, Rebel" and The Who's "So Sad About Us" among others.

Actor 
Cassidy concentrated on stage acting for most of the 1980s and early 1990s. He appeared on Broadway and West End productions such as Mass Appeal and Bus Stop, as well as the American premiere of Pass/Fail at the Mark Taper Forum in Los Angeles. Cassidy won a Dramalogue award for his work in Mark Sheriden's Diary of a Hunger Strike at the L.A.T.C., and his final stage appearance was opposite his half-brother David in the Broadway production of Blood Brothers (which successfully ran for over a year on Broadway, landing Cassidy on the cover of “People” magazine for the third time). It was during this production that Cassidy wrote his first television pilot, American Gothic, opening the door to a long-term contract with Universal Television.

Writer and producer 
Since then, Cassidy has created, written, and produced numerous shows for network and cable including American Gothic (1995–1996, produced with Sam Raimi), Roar (1997, starring Heath Ledger), Cover Me (2000–2001), Invasion (2005–2006) and Ruby & The Rockits (2009, starring his brothers Patrick and David). Cassidy currently serves as executive producer and writer for New Amsterdam (2018–present, starring Ryan Eggold) on NBC.

In 2021, Cassidy took his one-man show The Magic of a Midnight Sky to the stage, playing to standing-room-only crowds nationwide, his first live music performance in almost forty years.

Personal life 
Cassidy grew up in Los Angeles and New York City, attending boarding school in Bucks County, Pennsylvania at the Solebury School in Solebury Township, and graduating from Beverly Hills High School. In addition to an elder half-brother, David Cassidy, he has two younger brothers, Patrick and Ryan Cassidy.

Marriages and children 
Cassidy has been married three times and has eight children. His first wife was Ann Pennington, a model and former Playboy playmate; she and Cassidy married in 1979 and divorced in 1993. From this marriage Cassidy has a daughter, Caitlin ( 1981); a son, Jake (born 1985); and a stepdaughter, Jessica (born 1970).

He married actress Susan Diol in 1995. They have one daughter, Juliet (born 1998), and divorced in 2003.

He has been married to producer Tracey Lynne Turner since 2004. They have four children: Caleb (born 2005), Roan (born 2006), Lila (born 2008), and Mairin (born 2011).

Discography 

Shaun Cassidy (1977)
Born Late (1977)
Under Wraps (1978)
Room Service (1979)
Wasp (1980)

Filmography

Actor 
1976: Born of Water
1977–79: The Hardy Boys/Nancy Drew Mysteries
1979: Like Normal People (TV movie)
1980–81: Breaking Away
1985: Breakfast With Les & Bess (TV play)
1987: General Hospital (regular role)
1987: Murder, She Wrote; episode: "Murder in a Minor Key"
1988: Once Upon a Texas Train (TV movie)
1988: Matlock; episode: "The Investigation"
1988: Roots: The Gift (TV movie) 
 2019: The Masked Singer (Macaw/ Himself)

Writer 
1991: Strays (TV movie)
1994: Midnight Run for Your Life (TV movie)
1995: American Gothic (8 episodes)
1997: Roar (5 episodes)
1997: Players (TV series) (pilot only)
2000: Cover Me: Based on the True Life of an FBI Family (creator)
2001: The Agency (3 episodes)
2003: Cold Case
2004: The Mountain (2 episodes)
2005–06: Invasion (12 episodes)
2009: Ruby & the Rockits (2 episodes)
2014: Hysteria (pilot)
2017: Emerald City (2 episodes)
2018–present: New Amsterdam (3 episodes)

Producer 
1995: American Gothic (supervising producer; producer for pilot)
1997: Roar (executive producer)
1998: Hollyweird (executive producer)
2000–01: Cover Me: Based on the True Life of an FBI Family (executive producer)
2001–03: The Agency (executive producer)
2003: Cold Case (executive producer)
2004–05: The Mountain (executive producer)
2005–06: Invasion (executive producer)
2008: Inseparable (executive producer)
2009: Ruby & The Rockits (executive producer)
2011–12: Blue Bloods (consulting producer)
2012: The Frontier (executive producer)
2014: Hysteria (pilot; executive producer)
2016: Emerald City (executive producer)
2018–present: New Amsterdam (executive producer)

References

External links 

1958 births
Living people
20th-century American male actors
20th-century American singers
20th-century American male singers
20th-century American male writers
21st-century American male writers
American male child actors
American male pop singers
American male screenwriters
American male singer-songwriters
American male television actors
American male television writers
American pop rock singers
American television writers
Beverly Hills High School alumni
Male actors from Los Angeles
Screenwriters from California
Singers from Los Angeles
Singer-songwriters from California
Television producers from California
Warner Records artists
Writers from Los Angeles